Nikolia "Niki" Mitropoulou (born February 16, 1982, in Galatsi, Athens) is a Greek high jumper. She attained her best jump of 1.91 metres from the Greek national championships to secure a spot on the Greek athletics squad for the 2004 Summer Olympics. Throughout her sporting career, Mitropoulou trained as a full-fledged member of the athletics team for Panionios G.S.S. in Nea Smyrni, Athens.

Mitropoulou qualified as a lone athlete for the Greek squad in the women's high jump at the 2004 Summer Olympics in Athens, by setting up a B-standard of 1.91 metres from the Greek national championships at the Olympic Stadium. Mitropoulou cleared a satisfying height on her third attempt and missed badly on the first two at both 1.80 and 1.85 metres to share a thirty-first overall place effort with Kazakhstan's Marina Aitova in the qualifying round, failing to reach a 1.89-metre mark on her succeeding jump and thereby advance further to the final.

References

External links

1982 births
Living people
Greek female high jumpers
Olympic athletes of Greece
Athletes (track and field) at the 2004 Summer Olympics
Athletes from Athens
21st-century Greek women